Ian Spencer (born 26 August 1984) is a former English cricketer. He was a right-handed batsman and wicket-keeper who played for Cheshire. He was born in Whiston.

Spencer, who appeared for Cheshire in the Minor Counties Championship between 2002 and 2004, made a single List A appearance for the side, during the C&G Trophy in August 2003, against Bedfordshire. He scored 3 runs from the tailend.

Spencer took three catches in the match from behind the stumps, including that of Shaun Young.

External links
Ian Spencer at Cricket Archive 

1984 births
Living people
English cricketers
Cheshire cricketers
People from Whiston, Merseyside